Alex "Wolfman" Story (born November 27, 1974) is an American singer best known for being the lead vocalist of punk/metal bands Cancerslug (1999–present) and Doyle (2013–present). Story also performs as a solo artist under his own name, as well as in multiple side projects.

Life and career 

Story was born in Decatur, Alabama. He is the founding member of rock/punk group Cancerslug, formed in 1999. He has recorded a dozen albums with this band that encountered various lineup changes before being a long-standing trio with members Mike Horgan on drums and Cassie Baher on bass. Mike Horgan died in March 2019. In early 2020, Jade Jones (b. 1995) became the new drummer.

Among the bands that influenced his songwriting, Story mentions the Misfits, The Cramps, Dwarves, The Germs, and Fear.

Story has also played guitar in other bands such as Bela's Electric Freakshow and Used Skin. While remaining with Cancerslug, he has been working with side bands Clitrot where he plays guitar and does backup vocals. Around 2008, he joined Gorgeous Frankenstein featuring Doyle Wolfgang von Frankenstein, ex-Misfits lead guitarist.

In 2011, he formed the group The Ultra Creeps with Cassie Baher and Helen Faulkner. The band recorded a demo available through Reverbnation.

Since 2013, Story also fronts the horror metal band Doyle with Doyle Wolfgang von Frankenstein. Story and Doyle co-wrote together the album Abominator, released in 2013.

In 2014–2015, Story also released solo albums under his own name and some under his side project named "Born In Angel Blood".

Performance: The Wolfman 
Story wears large sideburns, and when he performs live, he often disguises himself as a werewolf inspired by the 1940s movie The Wolf Man. He is commonly referred to as Alex "Wolfman" Story.

Discography

with Cancerslug

Albums 
 Whore, not on label, 1999; 2012; Slugcult Records, 2014; Remastered, Alex Story, 2015
 Alabama Bloodbath, 2000; Reissue, Slugcult Records, "The Cancerslug Essentials Collection", 2014
 Soulless, not on label, 2002; Remaster Edition, Slugcult Records, "The Cancerslug Essentials Collection", 2014
 The Beast with Two Backs, 2002; Slugcult Records, "The Cancerslug Essentials Collection", 2014
 Book of Rats, Slugcult Records, 2003; Reissue, Slugcult Records, "The Cancerslug Essentials Collection", 2014
 The Ancient Enemy, 2007; Reissue, Slugcult Records, "The Cancerslug Essentials Collection", 2014
 Tales of a Butcher, Drink Blood Records, 2009
 Seasons of Sickness..., Slugcult Records, 2013; 2014
 Rootwork, Cancerslug, self-release, 2014
 Sassy for Satan, Slugcult Records, 2016
 Symphony of Savagery, Slugcult Records, 2016
 Fuck the Bullshit This Is: Cancerslug, Slugcult Records, 2017
 Beating a Dead Whore, Slugcult Records, 2018
 The Courtesy Flush, Slugcult Records, 2020
 Moonlight Martyrs, Slugcult Records, 2020
 In the Halls of the Hopeless, Slugcult Records, 2021
 Full Term Abortions, Slugcult Records, 2022

Demos 
 Curse Arcanum, Demo, 2003; Reissue, Slugcult Records, "The Cancerslug Essentials Collection", 2014
 The Decade of Decay, Demo, 2009 ; Reissue, Slugcult Records, "The Cancerslug Essentials Collection", 2015
 Most Vile – The Rare Demos, Vol. 1, Cancerslug, self-release, 2014
 Crudest – The Rare Demos, Vol. 2, Cancerslug, self-release, 2014
 Rudest – The Rare Demos, Vol. 3, Cancerslug, self-release, 2014
Human Traffic Jams: Demos and Acoustic Versions, self-release, 2018

Singles & EPs 
 The Unnameable, Cancerslug, self-released, 2006; 2007; Reissue, Slugcult Records, 2012

Compilations 
 Battle Hymns I, 2004; Cancerslug, self-released, 2012; Reissue, Slugcult Records, 2015
 Battle Hymns II, 2004; Cancerslug, self-released, 2012
 The Unkindest Cut 2000–2013, Slugcult Records, Alex Story Music, 2013

Videos 
 "Do Demons Sing?", Slugcult Records, 2014

with The Ultra Creeps 
 Demo, on Reverbnation, 2011

with Doyle 
 Abominator, Monster Man Records, 2013
 Doyle II: As We Die, EMP Label Group, Monster Man Records, 2017

Solo albums 

 Alex Story II, Slugcult Records, 2014
 Alex Story III. The Final Ptp, Slugcult Records, 2014
 Pulling the Plug, Slugcult Records, 2014
 The Junkie Chronicles, self-released, 2015
 The Saint of Death, Slugcult Records, 2015

Singles and EPs
 Tracks, Slugcult Records, 2015
 A Special Place, Slugcult Records, 2015

Compilations
 Make War Not Love (The Very Best of 'Pulling the Plug'), Slugcult Records, 2014

Born in Angel Blood

 The Lost Requiem, Born in Angel Blood, self-released, 2014
 Alex Story Presents Born in Angel Blood, Sister Lucifer (A Beginners Guide to Mass Suicide), Slugcult Records, 2015

Books 
 The Slugcult Bible: The Complete Alex Story Lyrical-Ritual Compendium, CreateSpace Independent Publishing Platform, 2015
 Picking The Vultures Bones, CreateSpace Independent Publishing Platform, 2015

References

External links 
 Cancerslug's official website
 Slugcult official website
 Doyle official website

1974 births
American heavy metal singers
American punk rock singers
Horror punk musicians
Living people
People from Decatur, Alabama
Singers from Alabama
Songwriters from Alabama
21st-century American singers
21st-century American male singers
American male songwriters